The Women's and Children's Hospital is located on King William Road in North Adelaide, Australia.

It is one of the major hospitals in Adelaide and is a teaching hospital of the University of Adelaide, the University of South Australia and Flinders University.

It was created through the amalgamation of the Queen Victoria Hospital and Adelaide Children's Hospital in March 1989. The new (in name) hospital occupies the site of the former Adelaide Children's Hospital.

The hospital is part of the Children, Youth and Women's Health Service along with the Child and Youth Health.

The Children's and adolescents' wards cater for all paediatric specialities. The women's wards cater for antenatal, gynaecology, neonatal, and postnatal disciplines.

The Women's & Children's Hospital Foundation is the primary charity for the hospital and exists to raise money and invest initiatives that support the care and future health of South Australia's women, babies and children.

The hospital is part of the wider Women's and Children's Health Network, which includes the Child and Family Health Service, Child and Adolescent Mental Health Service, Metropolitan Youth Health, Women's Health, Yarrow Place, Torrens House and Helen Mayo House.

The official Facebook Page of the Women's and Children's Hospital and Health Network is @WCHNetwork.

A new hospital will be built next to the New Royal Adelaide Hospital, near the river Torrens.

Emergency
The Women's and Children's Hospital Paediatric Emergency Department is open 24 hours, 7 day a week and is located on the ground floor, with access from Kermode Street, Sir Edwin Smith Avenue and Brougham Place.

Wards
Children's Wards
4th Floor Medical Ward
Adolescent Ward
Boylan Ward
Brookman Ward 
Campbell Ward
Cassia Ward
Day of Surgery Admissions
Newland Ward
Paediatric Day Surgery Unit
Rose Ward
Emergency Extended Care Unit

Women's Wards
Antenatal and Gynaecology Ward
Gynaecology Surgical Day Unit
Helen Mayo House
Neonatal Intensive Care Unit
Postnatal Ward
Special Care Baby Unit

See also
List of hospitals in Australia
List of children's hospitals

References

External links
Children, Youth and Women's Health Service
Women's & Children's Hospital Foundation Inc

Children's hospitals in Australia
Teaching hospitals in Australia
Hospitals in Adelaide
Hospitals established in 1989
1989 establishments in Australia
North Adelaide
Women's hospitals
Women in Australia